A mashup (also mesh, mash up, mash-up, blend, bastard pop or bootleg) is a creative work, usually a song, created by blending two or more pre-recorded songs, typically by superimposing the vocal track of one song seamlessly over the instrumental track of another and changing the tempo and key where necessary. Such works are considered "transformative" of original content and in the United States they may find protection from copyright claims under the "fair use" doctrine of copyright law.

History
The 1967 Harry Nilsson album Pandemonium Shadow Show features what is nominally a cover of the Beatles' "You Can't Do That" but actually introduced the "mashup" to studio-recording. Nilsson's recording of "You Can't Do That" mashes his own vocal recreations of more than a dozen Beatles songs into this track. Nilsson conceived the combining of many overlaying songs into one track after he played a chord on his guitar and realized how many Beatles songs it could apply to. This recording has led some to describe Harry Nilsson as the inventor of the mashup.

Although described as a medley in its title, "Do It Again Medley with Billie Jean" by Italian music project Club House could be described as one of the first ever commercially released mashups in 1983. The song combines elements of "Do It Again", a 1973 Top 10 hit in the US and Canada by Steely Dan, with Michael Jackson's #1 hit from earlier in the year, "Billie Jean". It reached #11 in the UK, and the Top 10 in Belgium, Ireland and the Netherlands.

In 1990, Norman Cook reached #1 on the UK charts with his act Beats International with "Dub Be Good To Me", essentially a mashup of re-recorded vocals of The SOS Band's "Just Be Good To Me" with The Clash's "The Guns of Brixton", making it the first mashup to achieve significant mainstream success.

The 1990 John Zorn album Naked City features a version of Ornette Coleman's "Lonely Woman" set over the bassline of Roy Orbison's "Pretty Woman".

In 1991, The Source featuring Candi Staton released "You Got The Love", based on a mashup created by DJ Eren Abdullah that had been an underground club hit since 1989, placing a Candi Staton a cappella over an instrumental version of Frankie Knuckles and Jamie Principle's house classic, "Your Love". It reached #4 on the UK charts, and had continued success over subsequent years with several remixes and a cover by Florence + The Machine.

In 1994, the experimental band Evolution Control Committee released the first modern mashup tracks on their hand-made cassette album, Gunderphonic. These "Whipped Cream Mixes" combined a pair of Public Enemy a cappellas with instrumentals by Herb Alpert and the Tijuana Brass. First released on home-made cassettes in early 1992, it was later pressed on 7" vinyl, and distributed by Eerie Materials in the mid-1990s. The tracks gained some degree of notoriety on college radio stations in the United States.

The name Pop Will Eat Itself was taken from an NME feature on the band Jamie Wednesday, written by David Quantick, which proposed the theory that because popular music simply recycles good ideas continuously, the perfect pop song could be written by combining the best of those ideas into one track. Hence, "pop will eat itself".

Pre-empting the rise of the mashup in the 2000s, German trance act Fragma reached #1 in the UK and the Top 10 in Australia and across Europe with "Toca's Miracle", a mashup of their previous single "Toca Me" and Coco Star's 1996 single "I Need A Miracle", initially created by British DJ Vimto in 1999.

The mashup movement gained momentum again in 2001 with the release of the 2 Many DJs album As Heard on Radio Soulwax Pt. 2 by Soulwax's Dewaele brothers, which combined 45 different tracks; the same year a remix of Christina Aguilera's "Genie in a Bottle" was also released by Freelance Hellraiser, which coupled Aguilera's vocals with the guitar track of "Hard to Explain" by New York's the Strokes, in a piece called "A Stroke of Genie-us".

In 2001, English producer Richard X had created a bootleg mashup of Adina Howard's "Freak Like Me" and Tubeway Army's "Are "Friends" Electric?", titled "We Don't Give a Damn About Our Friends", which became a successful underground dance track under his alias "Girls on Top". He could not get permission to use the original vocals to release the mashup commercially, so he enlisted the English girl group Sugababes to re-record the vocals. It was released in April 2002, giving the group their first UK #1 single, and drawing further recognition, acclaim and mainstream success for the mashup genre. Richard X had continued success with two more mashups reaching the UK Top 10: "Being Nobody" (#3), with pop group Liberty X combining vocals of Chaka Khan and Rufus's "Ain't Nobody" with The Human League's "Being Boiled", and "Finest Dreams" (#8), featuring American vocalist Kelis singing the vocals from The SOS Band's "The Finest" over an instrumental of The Human League's "The Things That Dreams Are Made Of".

At the 2002 Brit Awards held on 20 February 2002, Australian pop singer Kylie Minogue performed a mash-up version of her #1 hit "Can't Get You Out of My Head", combined with New Order's song "Blue Monday". The live performance is cited as one of the first by a mainstream recording artist to utilise a mashup, and was ranked at number 40 on The Guardian'''s 2011 list of 50 Key Events in the History of Dance Music. The mashup, titled "Can't Get Blue Monday Out of My Head", was later released as the B-side of "Love at First Sight" and was included on Minogue's 2008 remix album Boombox. In the years that followed, mash-ups became more widely used by major artists in their live performances, particularly to update previous material to meld with the themes and sounds of their more recent work. For example, on her 2006 Confessions Tour, Madonna incorporated elements of The Trammps's "Disco Inferno" in the performance of her 2000 hit "Music", to assist the song in blending in with the tour's disco theme. On her 2008 Sticky & Sweet Tour, she performed a mash-up of her 1990 hit "Vogue" with the instrumental of her recent single "4 Minutes", to update it with the more urban sound of her Hard Candy album.

In August 2003, Madonna's single "Hollywood" was remixed with "Into the Groove" and performed with Missy Elliott under the title "Into the Hollywood Groove" as part of a promotional campaign for clothing retailer, GAP, prompting criticism for exploiting the underground culture of the mash-up for commercial gain.

The mid-2000s saw a massive surge in popularity for the mashup, including single releases that climbed high into the dance charts and even the mainstream top-40 charts. Such hits include Linkin Park and Jay Z's “Numb/Encore”, Party Ben's “Boulevard of Broken Songs”, Alex Gaudino's  “Destination Calabria”, Mousse T. vs The Dandy Warhols' "Horny As A Dandy" (originally mixed by produced by Loo & Placido) and Mylo vs Miami Sound Machine's “Doctor Pressure”. In 2001, Henry Mancini produced a mashup version of Every Breath You Take by The Police for the 27th Episode of The Sopranos 'Mr. Ruggerio's Neighborhood'. The Grey Album, which mashed up recordings by Jay-Z and The Beatles, also became notoriously popular.

With the release of Rock Band in 2007 and its sequels later on, numerous mashup artists discovered that every song in the games had each instrument stored on separate tracks to each other, meaning that song instrumentals, acapellas and even individual instruments could easily be sampled and kept uncompressed and clear. Among others, American comedian Neil Cicierega used this method to produce his four mashup albums, Mouth Sounds, Mouth Silence, Mouth Moods and Mouth Dreams.

DJ Earworm's annual “United States of Pop” mashups became season events, with his 2009 edition alone garnering critical acclaim as well as racking up more than 53 million views on YouTube. Mashups also helped launch the careers of acts such as Girl Talk and Madeon, with the latter's “Pop Culture” accruing more than 55 million views. Acts such as DJs from Mars and Mashd N Kutcher would go on to make mashups a huge part of their creative output.

Launched in San Francisco in 2003, Bootie was the first recurring club night in the United States dedicated solely to the burgeoning art form of the bootleg mashup, and as of 2019 hosted monthly parties in cities around the globe, including Los Angeles, Paris, Boston, Munich, and New York City. The party's slogan, "Music for the A.D.D. Generation" also inspired the creation of "A.D.D", Israel's first mashup-dedicated party. The Best of Bootie mashup compilation series is produced by Bootie creators A Plus D. Released every December since 2005, the compilations are annual Internet sensations, with each album requiring 5,000 GB+ of download bandwidth.

 Video games DJ Hero is a 2009 rhythm video game developed by Activision that includes over 90 pre-made mashups, where the player scores points by hitting notes on the turntable controller.Fuser is a 2020 video game developed by Harmonix that allows the player to create mashups of over 100 songs, using four instrument stems from the master recording.

See also
 Mashup (culture)
 Mashup (video)
 Sound collage
 Plunderphonics
 WhoSampled
 Parody music
 Quodlibet
 Pastiche
 "One Song to the Tune of Another"

References

Further reading
 Paul Morley (2003). Words and Music: A History of Pop in the Shape of a City. Bloomsbury. .
 Jeremy J. Beadle (1993). Will Pop Eat Itself? Faber & Faber. .
 Brøvig-Hanssen, Ragnhild, 2018. "Musical Recycling: Mashup Aesthetics and Authorship." Selected Paper of Internet Research, SPIR, 2016: The 17th Annual Conference of the Association of Internet Researchers. Berlin, Germany. http://spir.aoir.org.
Roseman, Jordan (2006). Audio Mashup Construction Kit. .
Hughes, J. & Lang, K. (2006). Transmutability: Digital Decontextualization, Manipulation, and Recontextualization as a New Source of Value in the Production and Consumption of Culture Products. In Proceedings of the 39th Annual Hawaii International Conference on System Sciences – Volume 08.
 Sinnreich, Aram (2010). Mashed Up: Music, Technology & the Rise of Configurable Culture'' . .

 
Musical techniques
Repurposing
1990s in music
2000s in music
2010s in music
Intellectual property activism